The 2004–05 Israeli Noar Leumit League was the 11th season since its introduction in 1994 as the top-tier football in Israel for teenagers between the ages 18–20.

Maccabi Tel Aviv won the title, whilst Hapoel Acre and F.C. Neve Yosef were relegated.

Final table

External links
Noar Premier League 04-05 One.co.il 

Israeli Noar Premier League seasons
Youth